Youppi! Youppi! wears an "!" instead of a jersey number.

History

Youppi!, a creation of Acme Mascots, Inc. (a division of Harrison/Erickson, Inc.), was commissioned by Montreal Expos vice-president Roger D. Landry. Originally leased by the baseball team in 1979, the mascot was eventually purchased by the Expos and represented them until they moved to Washington, D.C., after the 2004 season. Youppi! was designed by Bonnie Erickson, formerly a designer for Jim Henson, and the designer of Miss Piggy, Statler & Waldorf and other Muppet characters.  The orange, hairy giant was a popular figure at Olympic Stadium prior to the Expos' relocation to Washington, D.C.

Notoriety
Youppi! was the first mascot to be thrown out of a Major League Baseball game: during the 1989 Expos season, on August 23 while atop the visitors' dugout in the 11th inning, Youppi! took a running leap, landing hard and noisily on its roof, and then sneaked into a front row seat. Los Angeles Dodgers manager Tommy Lasorda complained to the umpires and Youppi! was ejected by Bob Davidson, though he later returned, confined to the home team's dugout roof, as Montreal eventually lost 1–0 in 22 innings. Youppi! was also a frequent joke punchline of notoriously sarcastic Atlanta Braves broadcaster Skip Caray. Youppi! was also referenced by pitcher Bill Lee during interviews in Ken Burns's Baseball documentary.

Youppi! is one of only three mascots featured as displays at the Baseball Hall of Fame. The others are the Phillie Phanatic of Philadelphia, another design by Erickson, and the Famous Chicken from San Diego.

The Montreal-based political cartoonist Terry Mosher, better known as "Aislin", depicted or referenced Youppi! on several occasions, including a prescient 1988 cartoon drawn at a time when the Expos were having a poor season and depicting then-general manager of the Canadiens Serge Savard receiving a phone call from Youppi!, presumably seeking employment.

Youppi! was voted to the Mascot Hall of Fame in December 2019, and was inducted in June 2020. Youppi! is the first mascot of a Canadian team to receive the honor.

From baseball to hockey
After the Expos moved to Washington, D.C. and became the Washington Nationals, the Nationals initially stated that Youppi! would still be a part of the team in some capacity. However, the team adopted a new mascot, the eagle "Screech".  For months after the move, the fate of Youppi! hung in the balance. Negotiations were held with ten groups, including the Montreal Alouettes.

On September 16, 2005, the Montreal Canadiens announced that Youppi! would become the first official mascot of the organization, and the first mascot to ever switch between any two major sports leagues in North America. Prior to Youppi!, the Canadiens had no mascot. The terms of acquisition were reportedly in the six figures. Youppi! now sports the Canadiens' bleu-blanc-rouge (blue, white, and red) jersey. Youppi!'s first game in the Bell Centre was on October 18, 2005.

On February 19, 2012, at the Canadiens' first home game after the death of Montreal Expos great Gary Carter, Youppi! wore the Expos colours in Carter's memory.

On May 16, 2014, on the eve of the Canadiens series against the New York Rangers in the 2014 Eastern Conference Finals, New York City native Jimmy Fallon, the host of NBC's Tonight Show, which is taped in New York, made a bet with the Montreal Canadiens that if they won the series, Fallon would wear a Montreal jersey during his opening monologue. However, if the Rangers won the series, Youppi! would have to wear a Rangers jersey around Montreal and post at least ten pictures of him doing so on the Canadiens' Twitter account and also change their avatar to a pic of Rangers goalie Henrik Lundqvist playing guitar. The Rangers won the series on May 29 in six games. As such, on June 1, the Canadiens honoured their bet and a dejected Youppi! was photographed around Montreal in a Rangers jersey with Fallon's name on the back, and the last photo, as Fallon stated, featured him riding the mechanical bull at Montreal bar Chez Serge.

See also
 List of National Hockey League mascots
 List of Major League Baseball mascots

References

External links
Official Youppi! website
Youppi

Major League Baseball team mascots
National Hockey League team mascots
Montreal Expos
Sport in Montreal
Montreal Canadiens
Mascots introduced in 1979
Canadian mascots
Fictional characters from Montreal
Culture of Montreal
1979 establishments in Quebec